The Santa Barbara County Fire Department (SBCFD) provides fire protection and emergency response services for the unincorporated areas of Santa Barbara County, California, and for multiple cities within the county. Together, these areas compose the Santa Barbara County Fire Protection District.

In addition to the unincorporated areas of Santa Barbara County, the department also services the communities of Santa Barbara, Goleta, Isla Vista/ UCSB campus, Santa Ynez, Santa Maria, Los Alamos, Casmalia, Lompoc (via automatic aid agreement), Solvang, New Cuyama, and Buellton. In addition they cover parts of the Los Padres National Forest, The majority of the Santa Barbara Coastline, substantial open space reserves, and many private ranch communities. The Santa Barbara County fire Department is a contract county with the California State Department of Forestry and Fire Protection.  Under the terms of the contract, the Fire Department is responsible for suppression of fires on SRA  "State  Responsibility Area" for CalFire.

The hills above Santa Barbara that comprise the Santa Ynez Mountains are a unique challenge on the California coast as they cause an effect known as the sundowner winds, which are very similar to the Santa Ana winds seen in nearby Santa Ana, California.

History
The SBCFD was initially founded on April 5, 1926. In 1974, Santa Barbara launched the paramedic program which placed trained paramedics at station 11 to work alongside the firefighters.

In 2020 (Effective 1/1/2020) Numbering Changes were made due to anticipated consolidation of regional dispatch services. For that, Station numbers 18, 22, 41 and 51 were changed to 38, 26, 27 and 34. Additional, overhead personnel and special units got new numbers and the auxiliary (reserve) engines were given 1xx series designations. There is a 3rd, "Central" Battalion now. Unknown, if this has been changed in the same timeslot.

Equipment

Type 1 Engine

Each of the 16 stations service by SBC FD are equipped with at least one Type 1 engine. The engines have the ability to pump 1,500 GPM and carry 500 gallons of water as well as 25 gallons of foam. For moving the water the engines carry over 2000 feet of hose in various diameters and over 100 feet of ladders. Each engine also has a set of the "Jaws of Life" as well as various other power tools, rescue gear and hand tools for both urban and brush fires.

Type 3 Engine
The Type 3 Engines are smaller than the Type 1's and are primarily used for vegetation fires as well as any type of emergency in the back country where the Type 1's cannot respond. The Type 3 has 4 x 4 capability and can thus climb hills and make it through rough terrain. One of the features that makes the Type 3 ideal for vegetation fires is that it can pump water while driving, whereas the Type 1 engine must be put into park to flow water. This allows the Type 3 to make "running attacks" on vegetation fires, a tactic that can help minimize the rate of spread by having a firefighter walk the edge of a fire with a hose line and the Type 3 trailing close behind. Each of the engines feature a 500-gallon water tank and a pump capable of producing 500 gpm @ 150 psi. It also carries a 20-gallon tank for the Class A foam injection.

The Type 3 Engines will often be sent elsewhere in the county as part of a Strike Team to assist with major incidents or emergencies. In 2013 multiple engines were sent north to assist with the Rim Fire which became the largest fire in California history.

Trucks

, Santa Barbara County has 3 aerial ladder trucks 1 front line located at Station 11 as well as an auxiliary ladder truck. The second truck is located at Station 30 in Solvang. The truck weighs  and features a  ladder and a pump that produces 1,250 GPM. The pump is connected to a nozzle at the top of the ladder allow water to be sprayed onto a fire from above. Besides being set up for fire fighting, the truck is also configured for technical, trench and confined space rescue. Along with the standard ladders and hoses, the truck also carries cutting torches, chainsaws, ropes, air bags and various other tools. The truck automatically responds to all technical rescues, vehicle accidents and structure fires in Battalion 1.

Helicopters
The Santa Barbara County Air Support Unit (ASU) is made up of two Bell UH-1H "Huey"s. The helicopters are jointly operated by the Fire Department and the Santa Barbara Sheriff's Office. Located at the Santa Ynez Airport adjacent to the Station 32, the ASU will often travel with a Rescue Paramedics from Station 32 when a medic is necessary. The helos are fitted for both hoisting of personnel for a rescue and for dropping of water during a fire. The underside can also be fitted with water dropping tanks that carry 320 gallons of water and have the ability to pump water from a reservoir or other water source or they can be filled on the ground with fire 
hose.

In October 2020, Santa Barbara County announced that a 2004 Sikorsky HH-60L “Blackhawk” helicopter had been purchased and would go into service in 2021. The helicopter was purchased with County funds and Fundraising from Direct Relief International (DRI) that resulted in raising a total donation of $1,151,000.

In March 2022, United rotorcraft delivered the finished, modified H-60 "FireHawk" to Santa Barbara County.  The modifications include a belly mounted water tank of approx.  1000 gals, new avionics, communications gear,  rescue hoist and configuration for aeromedical evacuations. The modifications are similar to those made to LA County, Ventura, San Diego and CalFire H-60s.

Helitender
To keep the squadron of helicopters that make up the Santa Barbara County Air Support Unit (ASU) airborne during a vegetation fire or any extended incident requires the use of a helitender. This specialized apparatus is  unit is based at the Santa Ynez Airport, where both helicopters are kept, adjacent to Station 32. As mentioned above, these helicopters can hold up to 190 gallons of fuel. The mobile helitender holds 1,200 gallons of Jet A fuel and is able to be driven to the incident. In this manner it can be used to help maximize the flying time over the scene. It also holds various equipment and tools for servicing the helos on scene.

Water Tenders
Santa Barbara County uses two different types of water tenders, two tactical and two supply units. The tactical units feature 4x4 capabilities and carry 1,500 gallons of water. They are specifically designed to carry water inside of a vegetation fire incident. These tenders are located at Station 22 in Orcutt and Station 32 in Santa Ynez. The supply units can carry 3,200 gallons of water to easily accessible areas. These are located at Station 18 in Gaviota and Station 41 in Cuyama.

Rescue Ambulance
The SBCFD has four Rescue Ambulances (RA) deployed around the county. Santa Barbara County was at the forefront of the firefighter/paramedic introduction to the industry. Although the primary Advanced Life Support (ALS) provider for the county is the private ambulance company American Medical Response (AMR), there are areas in which the county provides both dedicated ALS coverage and patient transport to hospital facility. The vehicles are based on the Ford modular-style ambulance outfitted with advanced life support capabilities. There are a total of five RAs throughout the county, two are located at Station 17 servicing UC Santa Barbara, two are at Station 41 in New Cuyama and one is at Station 51 in Vandenberg Village. In addition to medical emergencies, the RA will also respond with an initial assignment to any structure fire or multi-engine calls.

Stations and apparatus

Battalion 1
Battalion one, or South Battalion, consists of stations 11, 12, 13, 14, 15 and 17. Adjacent to station 11 is the office and quarters for the Battalion Chief serving Battalion 1. The designations for the South BC are 10 (A-shift), 12 (B-shift) and 14 (C-shift).

Battalion 2
Battalion two, or North Battalion, consists of stations 21, 23, 24, 26, and 27. Adjacent to Station 24 is the office and quarters for the Battalion Chief serving Battalion 2. The designations for the North BC are 11 (A-shift), 13 (B-shift) and 15 (C-shift).

Battalion 3
Battalion three, or Central Battalion, consists of stations 30, 31, 32, 34 and 38. The designations for the North BC are 16 (A-shift), 17 (B-shift) and 18 (C-shift).

Gallery

Notable Incidents
Painted Cave Fire (June–July 1990)
Zaca Fire (July–August 2007)
Gap Fire (July 2008)
Montecito Tea Fire (November 2008)
Jesusita Fire (May 2009)
Sherpa Fire (June 2016)
Rey Fire (August 2016)

Refugio oil spill

On May 19, 2015, the SBCFD responded around 11:40am to a report of a strong smell of oil coming from the area of Refugio State Beach. Crews found a ruptured  line with crude oil running into the Pacific Ocean. The department stated the spill went into a culvert that ran under the U.S. 101, and into the ocean.

References

County government agencies in California
Fire
Fire departments in California